William VanDeSteeg (born September 22, 1985) is a former American football linebacker. He was signed by the Baltimore Ravens as an undrafted free agent in 2009. He played college football at Minnesota.

VanDeSteeg was briefly a member of the Hartford Colonials, for whom he signed on June 15, 2010. He was released on July 14.

External links
Minnesota Golden Gophers bio

American football defensive ends
American football linebackers
Baltimore Ravens players
Hartford Colonials players
Living people
1985 births